The Centers for Disease Control and Prevention (CDC) is the national public health agency of the United States. It is a United States federal agency under the Department of Health and Human Services, and is headquartered in Atlanta, Georgia.

The agency's main goal is the protection of public health and safety through the control and prevention of disease, injury, and disability in the US and worldwide. The CDC focuses national attention on developing and applying disease control and prevention. It especially focuses its attention on infectious disease, food borne pathogens, environmental health, occupational safety and health, health promotion, injury prevention and educational activities designed to improve the health of United States citizens. The CDC also conducts research and provides information on non-infectious diseases, such as obesity and diabetes, and is a founding member of the International Association of National Public Health Institutes.

The CDC's current director as of 2023 is Rochelle Walensky. The director reports to the U.S. Department of Health and Human Services. Since 2020, the CDC has faced scrutiny for its handing of the COVID-19 pandemic. In 2022, following an internal examination, Walensky acknowledged "some pretty dramatic, pretty public mistakes, from testing to data to communications" and called for the reorganization of CDC.

History

Establishment 
The Communicable Disease Center was founded July 1, 1946, as the successor to the World War II Malaria Control in War Areas program of the Office of National Defense Malaria Control Activities.

Preceding its founding, organizations with global influence in malaria control were the Malaria Commission of the League of Nations and the Rockefeller Foundation. The Rockefeller Foundation greatly supported malaria control, sought to have the governments take over some of its efforts, and collaborated with the agency.

The new agency was a branch of the U.S. Public Health Service and Atlanta was chosen as the location because malaria was endemic in the Southern United States. The agency changed names (see infobox on top) before adopting the name Communicable Disease Center in 1946. Offices were located on the sixth floor of the Volunteer Building on Peachtree Street.

With a budget at the time of about $1million, 59 percent of its personnel were engaged in mosquito abatement and habitat control with the objective of control and eradication of malaria in the United States (see National Malaria Eradication Program).

Among its 369 employees, the main jobs at CDC were originally entomology and engineering. In CDC's initial years, more than six and a half million homes were sprayed, mostly with DDT. In 1946, there were only seven medical officers on duty and an early organization chart was drawn, somewhat fancifully, in the shape of a mosquito. Under Joseph Walter Mountin, the CDC continued to be an advocate for public health issues and pushed to extend its responsibilities to many other communicable diseases.

CDC employees collected the money to make the purchase. The benefactor behind the "gift" was Robert W. Woodruff, chairman of the board of The Coca-Cola Company. Woodruff had a long-time interest in malaria control, which had been a problem in areas where he went hunting. The same year, the PHS transferred its San Francisco based plague laboratory into the CDC as the Epidemiology Division, and a new Veterinary Diseases Division was established.

Growth 

An Epidemic Intelligence Service (EIS) was established in 1951, originally due to biological warfare concerns arising from the Korean War; EIS evolved into two-year postgraduate training program in epidemiology, and a prototype for Field Epidemiology Training Programs (FETP), which began in 1980.  The FETP is a large operation that has trained more than 18,000 disease detectives in over 80 countries. In 2020 FETP celebrated the 40th anniversary of the CDC's support for Thailand's Field Epidemiology Training Program. Thailand was the first FETP site created outside of North America and is found in numerous countries, reflecting CDC's influence in promoting this model internationally. The Training Programs in Epidemiology and Public Health Interventions Network (TEPHINET) has graduated 950 students.

The mission of the CDC expanded beyond its original focus on malaria to include sexually transmitted diseases when the Venereal Disease Division of the U.S. Public Health Service (PHS) was transferred to the CDC in 1957. Shortly thereafter, Tuberculosis Control was transferred (in 1960) to the CDC from PHS, and then in 1963 the Immunization program was established.

It became the National Communicable Disease Center effective July 1, 1967, and the Center for Disease Control on June 24, 1970.  At the end of the Public Health Service reorganizations of 1966–1973, it was promoted to being a principal operating agency of PHS.

Recent history 
It was renamed to the plural Centers for Disease Control effective October 14, 1980, as the modern organization of having multiple constituent centers was established.  By 1990, it had four centers formed in the 1980s: the Center for Infectious Diseases, Center for Chronic Disease Prevention and Health Promotion, the Center for Environmental Health and Injury Control, and the Center for Prevention Services; as well as two centers that had been absorbed by CDC from outside: the National Institute for Occupational Safety and Health in 1973, and the National Center for Health Statistics in 1987.

An act of the United States Congress appended the words "and Prevention" to the name effective October 27, 1992. However, Congress directed that the initialism CDC be retained because of its name recognition.  Since the 1990s, the CDC focus has broadened to include chronic diseases, disabilities, injury control, workplace hazards, environmental health threats, and terrorism preparedness. CDC combats emerging diseases and other health risks, including birth defects, West Nile virus, obesity, avian, swine, and pandemic flu, E. coli, and bioterrorism, to name a few. The organization would also prove to be an important factor in preventing the abuse of penicillin. In May 1994 the CDC admitted having sent samples of communicable diseases to the Iraqi government from 1984 through 1989 which were subsequently repurposed for biological warfare, including Botulinum toxin, West Nile virus, Yersinia pestis and Dengue fever virus.

On April 21, 2005, then–CDC Director Julie Gerberding formally announced the reorganization of CDC to "confront the challenges of 21st-century health threats". She established four Coordinating Centers. In 2009 the Obama Administration  re-evaluated this change and ordered them cut as an unnecessary management layer.

As of 2013, the CDC's Biosafety Level 4 laboratories were among the few that exist in the world. They included one of only two official repositories of smallpox in the world, with the other one located at the State Research Center of Virology and Biotechnology VECTOR in the Russian Federation. In 2014, the CDC revealed they had discovered several misplaced smallpox samples while their lab workers were "potentially infected" with anthrax.

The city of Atlanta annexed the property of the CDC headquarters effective January 1, 2018, as a part of the city's largest annexation within a period of 65 years; the Atlanta City Council had voted to do so the prior December. The CDC and Emory University had requested that the Atlanta city government annex the area. The headquarters were located in an unincorporated area, statistically in the Druid Hills census-designated place.

On August 17, 2022, Dr. Walensky said the CDC would make drastic changes in the wake of mistakes during the COVID-19 pandemic. She outlined an overhaul of how the CDC would analyze and share data and how they would communicate information to the general public. In her statement to all CDC employees, she said: "For 75 years, CDC and public health have been preparing for COVID-19, and in our big moment, our performance did not reliably meet expectations." Based on the findings of an internal report, Walensky concluded that "The CDC must refocus itself on public health needs, respond much faster to emergencies and outbreaks of disease, and provide information in a way that ordinary people and state and local health authorities can understand and put to use" (as summarized by the New York Times).

Organization

The CDC is organized into "Centers, Institutes, and Offices" (CIOs), with each organizational unit implementing the agency's activities in a particular area of expertise while also providing intra-agency support and resource-sharing for cross-cutting issues and specific health threats.

As of the most recent reorganization in February 2023, the CIOs are:
 Director
 National Center for Immunization and Respiratory Diseases
 National Center for Emerging and Zoonotic Infectious Diseases
 Division of Global Migration and Quarantine
 National Center for HIV/AIDS, Viral Hepatitis, STD, and TB Prevention
 National Center on Birth Defects and Developmental Disabilities
 National Center for Chronic Disease Prevention and Health Promotion
 National Center for Environmental Health / Agency for Toxic Substances and Disease Registry
 National Center for Injury Prevention and Control
 National Institute for Occupational Safety and Health
 National Center for State, Tribal, Local, and Territorial Public Health Infrastructure and Workforce
 Global Health Center
 Immediate Office of the Director
 Chief of Staff
 Office of the Chief Operating Officer
 Office of Policy, Performance, and Evaluation
 Office of Equal Employment Opportunity and Workplace Equity
 Office of Communications
 Office of Health Equity
 Office of Science
 CDC Washington Office
 Office of Laboratory Science and Safety
 Office of Readiness and Response
 Center for Forecasting and Outbreak Analytics
 Office of Public Health Data, Surveillance, and Technology
 National Center for Health Statistics

The Office of Public Health Preparedness was created during the 2001 anthrax attacks shortly after the terrorist attacks of September 11, 2001. Its purpose was to coordinate among the government the response to a range of biological terrorism threats.

Locations 
Most CDC centers are located in Atlanta.  Building 18, which opened in 2005 at the CDC's main Roybal campus (named in honor of the late Representative Edward R. Roybal), contains the premier BSL4 laboratory in the United States.

A few of the centers are based in or operate other domestic locations:
 The National Center for Health Statistics is primarily located in Hyattsville, Maryland, with a branch in Research Triangle Park in North Carolina.
 The National Institute for Occupational Safety and Health's primary locations are Cincinnati; Morgantown, West Virginia; Pittsburgh; Spokane, Washington; and Washington, D.C., with branches in Denver; Anchorage, Alaska; and Atlanta.
 The CDC Washington Office is based in Washington, D.C.
 Two divisions of the National Center for Emerging and Zoonotic Infectious Diseases are based outside Atlanta.  The Division of Vector-Borne Diseases is based in Fort Collins, Colorado, with a branch in San Juan, Puerto Rico.  The Arctic Investigations Program is based in Anchorage.

In addition, CDC operates quarantine facilities in 20 cities in the U.S.

Budget
CDC's budget for fiscal year 2018 was $11.9billion.  The CDC offers grants to help organizations advance health, safety and awareness at the community level in the United States. The CDC awards over 85 percent of its annual budget through these grants.

Workforce 
 CDC staff numbered approximately 15,000 personnel (including 6,000 contractors and 840 United States Public Health Service Commissioned Corps officers) in 170 occupations. Eighty percent held bachelor's degrees or higher; almost half had advanced degrees (a master's degree or a doctorate such as a PhD, D.O., or M.D.).

Common CDC job titles include engineer, entomologist, epidemiologist, biologist, physician, veterinarian, behavioral scientist, nurse, medical technologist, economist, public health advisor, health communicator, toxicologist, chemist, computer scientist, and statistician. The CDC also operates a number of notable training and fellowship programs, including those indicated below.

Epidemic Intelligence Service (EIS) 
The Epidemic Intelligence Service (EIS) is composed of "boots-on-the-ground disease detectives" who investigate public health problems domestically and globally. When called upon by a governmental body, EIS officers may embark on short-term epidemiological assistance assignments, or "Epi-Aids", to provide technical expertise in containing and investigating disease outbreaks. The EIS program is a model for the international Field Epidemiology Training Program.

Public Health Associates Program 
The CDC also operates the Public Health Associate Program (PHAP), a two-year paid fellowship for recent college graduates to work in public health agencies all over the United States. PHAP was founded in 2007 and currently has 159 associates in 34 states.

Leadership

The Director of CDC is a Senior Executive Service position that may be filled either by a career employee, or as a political appointment that does not require Senate confirmation, with the latter method typically being used. The director serves at the pleasure of the President and may be fired at any time. The CDC director concurrently serves as the Administrator of the Agency for Toxic Substances and Disease Registry.

Twenty directors have served the CDC or its predecessor agencies, including three who have served during the Trump administration (including Anne Schuchat who twice served as acting director) and three who have served during the Carter administration (including one acting director not shown here). Two served under Bill Clinton, but only one under the Nixon to Ford terms.

Datasets and survey systems
 CDC Scientific Data, Surveillance, Health Statistics, and Laboratory Information.
 Behavioral Risk Factor Surveillance System (BRFSS), the world's largest, ongoing telephone health-survey system.
 Mortality Medical Data System.
 Abortion statistics in the United States
 CDC WONDER (Wide-ranging ONline Data for Epidemiologic Research)
 Data systems of the National Center for Health Statistics

Areas of focus

Communicable diseases
The CDC's programs address more than 400 diseases, health threats, and conditions that are major causes of death, disease, and disability. The CDC's website has information on various infectious (and noninfectious) diseases, including smallpox, measles, and others.

Influenza 

The CDC targets the transmission of influenza, including the H1N1 swine flu, and launched websites to educate people about hygiene.

Division of Select Agents and Toxins 
Within the division are two programs: the Federal Select Agent Program (FSAP) and the Import Permit Program. The FSAP is run jointly with an office within the U.S. Department of Agriculture, regulating agents that can cause disease in humans, animals, and plants. The Import Permit Program regulates the importation of "infectious biological materials."

The CDC runs a program that protects the public from rare and dangerous substances such as anthrax and the Ebola virus. The program, called the Federal Select Agent Program, calls for inspections of labs in the U.S. that work with dangerous pathogens.

During the 2014 Ebola outbreak in West Africa, the CDC helped coordinate the return of two infected American aid workers for treatment at Emory University Hospital, the home of a special unit to handle highly infectious diseases.

As a response to the 2014 Ebola outbreak, Congress passed a Continuing Appropriations Resolution allocating $30,000,000 towards CDC's efforts to fight the virus.

Non-communicable diseases
The CDC also works on non-communicable diseases, including chronic diseases caused by obesity, physical inactivity and tobacco-use. The work of the Division for Cancer Prevention and Control, led from 2010 by Lisa C. Richardson, is also within this remit.

Antibiotic resistance
The CDC implemented their National Action Plan for Combating Antibiotic Resistant Bacteria as a measure against the spread of antibiotic resistance in the United States. This initiative has a budget of $161million and includes the development of the Antibiotic Resistance Lab Network.

Global health 
Globally, the CDC works with other organizations to address global health challenges and contain disease threats at their source. They work with many international organizations such as the World Health Organization (WHO) as well as ministries of health and other groups on the front lines of outbreaks. The agency maintains staff in more than 60 countries, including some from the U.S. but more from the countries in which they operate. The agency's global divisions include the Division of Global HIV and TB (DGHT), the Division of Parasitic Diseases and Malaria (DPDM), the Division of Global Health Protection (DGHP), and the Global Immunization Division (GID).

The CDC has been working with the WHO to implement the International Health Regulations (IHR), an agreement between 196 countries to prevent, control, and report on the international spread of disease, through initiatives including the Global Disease Detection Program (GDD).

The CDC has also been involved in implementing the U.S. global health initiatives President's Emergency Plan for AIDS Relief (PEPFAR) and President's Malaria Initiative.

Travelers' health
The CDC collects and publishes health information for travelers in a comprehensive book, CDC Health Information for International Travel, which is commonly known as the "yellow book." The book is available online and in print as a new edition every other year and includes current travel health guidelines, vaccine recommendations, and information on specific travel destinations. The CDC also issues travel health notices on its website, consisting of three levels:
 "Watch": Level 1 (practice usual precautions)
 "Alert": Level 2 (practice enhanced precautions)
 "Warning": Level 3 (avoid nonessential travel)

Vaccine safety 
The CDC uses a number of tools to monitor the safety of vaccines. The Vaccine Adverse Event Reporting System (VAERS), a national vaccine safety surveillance program run by CDC and the FDA. "VAERS detects possible safety issues with U.S. vaccines by collecting information about adverse events (possible side effects or health problems) after vaccination." The CDC's Safety Information by Vaccine page provides a list of the latest safety information, side effects, and answers to common questions about CDC recommended vaccines.

The Vaccine Safety Datalink (VSD) works with a network of healthcare organizations to share data on vaccine safety and adverse events. The Clinical Immunization Safety Assessment (CISA) project is a network of vaccine experts and health centers that research and assist the CDC in the area of vaccine safety.

CDC also runs a program called V-safe, a smartphone web application that allows COVID-19 vaccine recipients to be surveyed in detail about their health in response to getting the shot.

CDC Foundation 
The CDC Foundation operates independently from CDC as a private, nonprofit 501(c)(3) organization incorporated in the State of Georgia. The creation of the Foundation was authorized by section 399F of the Public Health Service Act to support the mission of CDC in partnership with the private sector, including organizations, foundations, businesses, educational groups, and individuals. From 1995 to 2022, the Foundation raised over $1.6 billion and launched more than 1,200 health programs. Bill Cosby formerly served as a member of the Foundation's Board of Directors, continuing as an honorary member after completing his term.

Activities 
The Foundation engages in research projects and health programs in more than 160 countries every year, including in focus areas such as cardiovascular disease, cancer, emergency response, and infectious diseases, particularly HIV/AIDS, Ebola, rotavirus, and COVID-19.
 EmPOWERED Health Program: Launched in November 2019 with funding from Amgen, the program works to empower cancer patients to become actively involved in the decision making around their treatments.

Criticism 
In 2015, BMJ associate editor Jeanne Lenzer raised concerns that the CDC's recommendations and publications may be influenced by donations received through the Foundation, which includes pharmaceutical companies.

Controversies

Tuskegee study of untreated syphilis in Black men
For 15 years, the CDC had direct oversight over the Tuskegee syphilis experiment. In the study, which lasted from 1932 to 1972, a group of Black men (nearly 400 of whom had syphilis) were studied to learn more about the disease. The disease was left untreated in the men, who had not given their informed consent to serve as research subjects. The Tuskegee Study was initiated in 1932 by the Public Health Service, with the CDC taking over the Tuskegee Health Benefit Program in 1995.

Gun violence
An area of partisan dispute related to CDC funding is studying firearms effectiveness.  Although the CDC was one of the first agencies to study gun violence as a public health issue, in 1996 the Dickey Amendment, passed with the support of the National Rifle Association, states "none of the funds available for injury prevention and control at the Centers for Disease Control and Prevention may be used to advocate or promote gun control".  Advocates for gun control oppose the amendment and have tried to overturn it.

Looking at the history of the passage of the Dickey Amendment, in 1992, Mark L. Rosenberg and five CDC colleagues founded the CDC's National Center for Injury Prevention and Control, with an annual budget of approximately $260,000. They focused on "identifying causes of firearm deaths, and methods to prevent them". Their first report, published in the New England Journal of Medicine in 1993 entitled "Guns are a Risk Factor for Homicide in the Home", reported "mere presence of a gun in a home increased the risk of a firearm-related death by 2.7 percent, and suicide fivefold—a "huge" increase." In response, the NRA launched a "campaign to shut down the Injury Center."  Two conservative pro-gun groups, Doctors for Responsible Gun Ownership and Doctors for Integrity and Policy Research joined the pro-gun effort, and, by 1995, politicians also supported the pro-gun initiative. In 1996, Jay Dickey (R) Arkansas introduced the Dickey Amendment statement stating "none of the funds available for injury prevention and control at the Centers for Disease Control and Prevention may be used to advocate or promote gun control" as a rider. in the 1996 appropriations bill." In 1997, "Congress re-directed all of the money for gun research to the study of traumatic brain injury." David Satcher, CDC head 1993-98 advocated for firearms research. In 2016 over a dozen "public health insiders, including current and former CDC senior leaders" told The Trace interviewers that CDC senior leaders took a cautious stance in their interpretation of the Dickey Amendment and that they could do more but were afraid of political and personal retribution. Rosenberg told The Trace, "Right now, there is nothing stopping them from addressing this life-and-death national problem!"

In 2013, the American Medical Association, the American Psychological Association, and the American Academy of Pediatrics sent a letter to the leaders of the Senate Appropriations Committee asking them "to support at least $10million within the Centers for Disease Control and Prevention (CDC) in FY 2014 along with sufficient new taxes at the National Institutes of Health to support research into the causes and prevention of violence. Furthermore, we urge Members to oppose any efforts to reduce, eliminate, or condition CDC funding related to violence prevention research." Congress maintained the ban in subsequent budgets.

Ebola 
In October 2014, the CDC gave a nurse with a fever who was later diagnosed with Ebola permission to board a commercial flight to Cleveland.

COVID-19 

The CDC has been widely criticized for its handling of the COVID-19 pandemic. In 2022, CDC director Rochlelle Walensky acknowledged "some pretty dramatic, pretty public mistakes, from testing to data to communications", based on the findings of an internal examination.

The first confirmed case of COVID-19 was discovered in the U.S. on January 20, 2020. But widespread COVID-19 testing in the United States was effectively stalled until February 28, when federal officials revised a faulty CDC test, and days afterward, when the Food and Drug Administration began loosening rules that had restricted other labs from developing tests. In February 2020, as the CDC's early coronavirus test malfunctioned nationwide, CDC Director Robert R. Redfield reassured fellow officials on the White House Coronavirus Task Force that the problem would be quickly solved, according to White House officials. It took about three weeks to sort out the failed test kits, which may have been contaminated during their processing in a CDC lab. Later investigations by the FDA and the Department of Health and Human Services found that the CDC had violated its own protocols in developing its tests. In November 2020, NPR reported that an internal review document they obtained revealed that the CDC was aware that the first batch of tests which were issued in early January had a chance of being wrong 33 percent of the time, but they released them anyway.

In May 2020, The Atlantic reported that the CDC was conflating the results of two different types of coronavirus tests — tests that diagnose current coronavirus infections, and tests that measure whether someone has ever had the virus. The magazine said this distorted several important metrics, provided the country with an inaccurate picture of the state of the pandemic, and overstated the country's testing ability.

In July 2020, the Trump administration ordered hospitals to bypass the CDC and instead send all COVID-19 patient information to a database at the Department of Health and Human Services. Some health experts opposed the order and warned that the data might become politicized or withheld from the public. On July 15, the CDC alarmed health care groups by temporarily removing COVID-19 dashboards from its website. It restored the data a day later.

In August 2020, the CDC recommended that people showing no COVID-19 symptoms do not need testing. The new guidelines alarmed many public health experts. The guidelines were crafted by the White House Coronavirus Task Force without the sign-off of Anthony Fauci of the NIH. Objections by other experts at the CDC went unheard. Officials said that a CDC document in July arguing for "the importance of reopening schools" was also crafted outside the CDC. On August 16, the chief of staff, Kyle McGowan, and his deputy, Amanda Campbell, resigned from the agency. The testing guidelines were reversed on September 18, 2020, after public controversy.

In September 2020, the CDC drafted an order requiring masks on all public transportation in the United States, but the White House Coronavirus Task Force blocked the order, refusing to discuss it, according to two federal health officials.

In October 2020, it was disclosed that White House advisers had repeatedly altered the writings of CDC scientists about COVID-19, including recommendations on church choirs, social distancing in bars and restaurants, and summaries of public-health reports.

In the lead up to 2020 Thanksgiving, the CDC advised Americans not to travel for the holiday saying, "It's not a requirement. It's a recommendation for the American public to consider." The White House coronavirus task force had its first public briefing in months on that date but travel was not mentioned.

The New York Times later concluded that the CDC's decisions to "ben[d] to political pressure from the Trump White House to alter key public health guidance or withhold it from the public [...] cost it a measure of public trust that experts say it still has not recaptured" as of 2022.

In May 2021, following criticism by scientists, the CDC updated its COVID-19 guidance to acknowledge airborne transmission of COVID-19, after having previously claimed that the majority of infections occurred via "close contact, not airborne transmission".

Until 2022, the CDC withheld critical data about COVID-19 vaccine boosters, hospitalizations and wastewater data.

On June 10, 2022, the Biden Administration ordered the CDC to remove the COVID-19 testing requirement for air travelers entering the United States.

In January 2022, it was revealed that the CDC had communicated with moderators at Facebook and Instagram over COVID-19 information and discussion on the platforms, including information that the CDC considered false or misleading and that might influence people not to get the COVID-19 vaccines.

Controversy over the Morbidity and Mortality Weekly Report

During the pandemic, the CDC Morbidity and Mortality Weekly Report (MMWR) came under pressure from political appointees at the Department of Health and Human Services (HHS) to modify its reporting so as not to conflict with what Trump was saying about the pandemic.

Starting in June 2020, Michael Caputo, the HHS assistant secretary for public affairs, and his chief advisor Paul Alexander tried to delay, suppress, change, and retroactively edit MMR releases about the effectiveness of potential treatments for COVID-19, the transmissibility of the virus, and other issues where the president had taken a public stance. Alexander tried unsuccessfully to get personal approval of all issues of MMWR before they went out.

Caputo claimed this oversight was necessary because MMWR reports were being tainted by "political content"; he demanded to know the political leanings of the scientists who reported that hydroxychloroquine had little benefit as a treatment while Trump was saying the opposite. In emails Alexander accused CDC scientists of attempting to "hurt the president" and writing "hit pieces on the administration".

In October 2020, emails obtained by Politico showed that Alexander requested multiple alterations in a report. The published alterations included a title being changed from "Children, Adolescents, and Young Adults" to "Persons." One current and two former CDC officials who reviewed the email exchanges said they were troubled by the "intervention to alter scientific reports viewed as untouchable prior to the Trump administration" that "appeared to minimize the risks of the coronavirus to children by making the report's focus on children less clear."

Eroding trust in the CDC as a result of COVID-19 controversies 
A poll conducted in September 2020 found that nearly 8 in 10 Americans trusted the CDC, a decrease from 87 percent in April 2020. Another poll showed an even larger drop in trust with the results dropping 16 percentage points. By January 2022, according to an NBC News poll, only 44% of Americans trusted the CDC compared to 69% at the beginning of the pandemic. As the trustworthiness eroded, so too did the information it disseminates. The diminishing level of trust in the CDC and the information releases also incited "vaccine hesitancy" with the result that "just 53 percent of Americans said they would be somewhat or extremely likely to get a vaccine."

In September 2020, amid the accusations and the faltering image of the CDC, the agency's leadership was called into question. Former acting director at the CDC, Richard Besser, said of Dr. Redfield that "I find it concerning that the CDC director has not been outspoken when there have been instances of clear political interference in the interpretation of science." In addition, Mark Rosenberg, the first director of CDC's National Center for Injury Prevention and Control, also questioned Redfield's leadership and his lack of defense of the science.

Historically, the CDC has not been a political agency; however, the COVID-19 pandemic, and specifically the Trump Administration's handling of the pandemic, resulted in a "dangerous shift" according to a previous CDC director and others. Four previous directors claim that the agency's voice was "muted for political reasons." Politicization of the agency has continued into the Biden administration as COVID-19 guidance is contradicted by State guidance and the agency is criticized as "CDC's credibility is eroding".

In 2021, the CDC, then under the leadership of the Biden Administration, received criticism for its mixed messaging surrounding COVID-19 vaccines, mask-wearing guidance, and the state of the pandemic.

Publications 
 CDC publications
 State of CDC report
 CDC Programs in Brief
 Morbidity and Mortality Weekly Report
 Emerging Infectious Diseases (monthly journal)
 Preventing Chronic Disease
 Vital statistics

Popular culture

Zombie Apocalypse campaign
On May 16, 2011, the Centers for Disease Control and Prevention's blog published an article instructing the public on what to do to prepare for a zombie invasion. While the article did not claim that such a scenario was possible, it did use the popular culture appeal as a means of urging citizens to prepare for all potential hazards, such as earthquakes, tornadoes, and floods.

According to David Daigle, the associate director for Communications, Public Health Preparedness and Response, the idea arose when his team was discussing their upcoming hurricane-information campaign and Daigle mused that "we say pretty much the same things every year, in the same way, and I just wonder how many people are paying attention." A social-media employee mentioned that the subject of zombies had come up a lot on Twitter when she had been tweeting about the Fukushima Daiichi nuclear disaster and radiation. The team realized that a campaign like this would most likely reach a different audience from the one that normally pays attention to hurricane-preparedness warnings and went to work on the zombie campaign, launching it right before hurricane season began. "The whole idea was, if you're prepared for a zombie apocalypse, you're prepared for pretty much anything," said Daigle.

Once the blog article was posted, the CDC announced an open contest for YouTube submissions of the most creative and effective videos covering preparedness for a zombie apocalypse (or apocalypse of any kind), to be judged by the "CDC Zombie Task Force". Submissions were open until October 11, 2011. They also released a zombie-themed graphic novella available on their website. Zombie-themed educational materials for teachers are available on the site.

See also
 U.S. Consumer Product Safety Commission
 Gun violence in the United States
 Haddon Matrix
 Home Safety Council
 List of national public health agencies
 National Highway Traffic Safety Administration
 National Institute for Occupational Safety and Health

References

Citations

Sources

Further reading

External links

 
 CDC in the Federal Register
 CDC-Wide Activities and Program Support account on USAspending.gov
 CDC Online Newsroom
 CDC Public Health Image Library
 CDC Global Communications Center
 CDC Emerging Infectious Diseases LaboratoryAtlanta, Georgia
 CDC WONDER online databases.
 Vaccine Safety Monitoring Systems and Methods (CDC) a slide deck presented at October 2019 Advisory Committee on Immunization Practices (ACIP) meeting

 
1946 establishments in Georgia (U.S. state)
Biosafety level 4 laboratories
Government agencies established in 1946
Medical and health organizations based in Georgia (U.S. state)
Medical research institutes in the United States
Buildings and structures in DeKalb County, Georgia
Buildings and structures in Atlanta
Organizations based in Atlanta
Organizations based in DeKalb County, Georgia
Government health agencies